Ulric Lamarche (1867 – 1921) was an American-born Canadian painter.

Born in California in 1867, his family moved to Mascouche, Quebec around 1874. By 1891 Lamarche had moved to Paris, where he studied art at the Académie Colarossi and the Académie Julian. He eventually returned to Montreal, where he remained until his death.

His 1912 portrait of  Charles Marcil is included in the Canadian House of Commons Portrait Gallery. His work is included in the collection of the Musée national des beaux-arts du Québec.

References

1867 births
1921 deaths
19th-century Canadian artists
20th-century Canadian artists